The 1885 World Series (the "World's Championship") was an end-of-the-year playoff series between the National League champion Chicago White Stockings and American Association champion St. Louis Browns. The Series was played in four cities (Chicago, St. Louis, Pittsburgh, and Cincinnati). It ended in a disputed 3–3–1 tie.

Game summaries
 Game 1 (October 14), Congress Street Grounds, Chicago — Darkness ended game 1 after 8 innings‚ with the teams tied 5–5.
 Game 2 (October 15), Sportsman's Park, St. Louis — With Chicago leading 5–4 in the sixth inning, Browns manager Charles Comiskey called his team off the field to protest a ruling made by umpire Dave Sullivan. The game was forfeited to Chicago.
 Game 3 (October 16), Sportsman's Park, St. Louis — St. Louis won, 7–4.
 Game 4 (October 17), Sportsman's Park, St. Louis — St. Louis won, 3–2.
 Game 5 (October 22), Recreation Park, Pittsburgh —  The fifth game was played at Pittsburgh. The weather was cold and not over 500 people were present. Chicago won easily (9–2) through superior batting and fielding. At the end of the seventh inning, the game was called on account of darkness.
 Game 6 (October 23), Cincinnati Base Ball Grounds, Cincinnati — The series moved from Pittsburgh to Cincinnati‚ setting a record for most host cities in a World Series. (The 1887 series was later staged in 10 cities.) Chicago took a 3–2 series lead by beating the Browns 9–2.
 Game 7 (October 24), Cincinnati Base Ball Grounds, Cincinnati — Behind pitcher Dave Foutz, St. Louis defeated Chicago 13–4 in the 7th and final game. The Browns claim the game 2 forfeit didn't count and therefore claim the championship. The two clubs split the $1000 prize.

See also
 1885 in baseball
 List of pre-World Series baseball champions

Footnotes

External links
 Baseball Reference – 1885 World Series

World Series
World Series
World Series
World Series
World Series
World Series
Baseball competitions in Chicago
Baseball competitions in Pittsburgh
Chicago Cubs
Baseball competitions in Cincinnati
Baseball competitions in St. Louis
St. Louis Browns
October 1885 sports events